Alisca is a genus of planthoppers in the subfamily Ricaniinae, erected by Carl Stål in 1870.

Species
Fulgoromorpha Lists on the Web includes the following, recorded from the Philippines and Sulawesi:
 Alisca circumpicta Stål, 1870
 Alisca compacta Melichar, 1898
 Alisca tagalica (Stål, 1865) - type species

References

External links
 

Ricaniidae
Hemiptera of Asia